Wilson Omar Pittoni Rodríguez, better known as Wilson Pittoni (born 14 August 1985), is a Paraguayan footballer who plays for Guaraní.

Biography

Born in San Antonio, Central Department, Wilson Pittoni defended Libertad in 2008. Wilson Pittoni played for Sol de América and Tacuary in 2009. He returned to Libertad in 2010, when he played 36 Paraguayan Primera División games and scored two goals. Wilson Pittoni won the Primera División Clausura tournament during that year. He joined Brazilian club Figueirense of the Série A in December 2010 to play in the 2011 season. After playing for Olimpia in the 2013 season, he joined Bahia of Brazil on 11 January 2014.

International career
Wilson Pittoni has made his debut for Paraguay in a friendly match against Honduras, having also made an appearance at the 2014 FIFA World Cup qualification match against Peru.

International goals
Scores and results list Paraguay's goal tally first.

Honors
Libertad
Paraguayan Primera División: 2010 Clausura

Bahia
Campeonato Baiano: 2014

References

External links
 

1985 births
Living people
Paraguayan people of Italian descent
Paraguayan footballers
Paraguay international footballers
Club Libertad footballers
Club Sol de América footballers
Club Tacuary footballers
Club Olimpia footballers
Figueirense FC players
Esporte Clube Bahia players
Paraguayan Primera División players
Campeonato Brasileiro Série A players
Association football midfielders
Paraguayan expatriate footballers
Expatriate footballers in Brazil